The  is a limited express train service in Japan operated by the East Japan Railway Company (JR East).

Station stops
Wakashio services operate over the Keiyo Line and Sotobo Line, stopping at the following stations. Some services terminate at Kazusa-Ichinomiya, and some services operate as "Local" all-stations services between Katsuura and Awa-Kamogawa. From March 2018, all trains pass through Ubara and Awa-Amatsu stations.

 - ※ -  - ※ -  -  -  -  -  -  - ※ -  - 
※:Some trains pass through these stations.

Shinjuku Wakashio services, operating mainly at weekends only, stop at the following stations between Shinjuku and Soga.

 -  -  -  -  -  -  ...

Rolling stock
 255 series 9-car EMUs (since 2 July 1993)
 E257-500 series 5/10-car EMUs (since 16 October 2004)

Wakashio services are operated using Makuhari-based 9-car 255 series EMU and 5- or 10-car E257-500 series EMU formations. The E257-500 series formations have no Green (first class) cars.

Past
 183 series 9-car EMUs (15 July 1972 – October 2004)

Formations
Trains are formed as shown below, with car 1 at the Tokyo end.

9-car 255 series

5-car E257 series

Car 1 is non-reserved on some services.

5+5-car E257 series

Cars 4,5,6,7 and 8 are non-reserved on some services.

Past formations
Trains were originally formed of 9-car 183 series EMUs with formed as shown below, including one Green car, as shown below.

9-car 183 series

 All cars except the Green car were non-reserved for Ohayo Wakashio and Hometown Wakashio services.

History
The Wakashio service commenced on 15 July 1972, using 183 series EMUs. Evening Hometown Wakashio services for commuters were introduced from 16 March 1991, operating from Tokyo to Kazusa-Ichinomiya.
New 255 series EMUs were introduced from 2 July 1993, initially branded as View Wakashio. Morning Oyaho Wakashio services for commuters were introduced from 3 December 1994, operating from Kazusa-Ichinomiya to Tokyo.
New E257-500 series EMUs were introduced from 16 October 2004, displacing the remaining 183 series trainsets. From the start of the revised timetable on 10 December 2005, Wakashio services were made entirely no-smoking.

The opening of the Tokyo Bay Aqua-Line road across the Tokyo Bay in 1997 saw increased competition from long-distance bus services offering cheaper fares, resulting in decreasing ridership figures on the Wakashio services. From the start of the 15 March 2014 timetable revision, the number of services was reduced from 15 to 13 return workings daily.

See also
 List of named passenger trains of Japan

References

External links

 JR East 255 series Shiosai/Wakashio/Sazanami 
 JR East E257 series Wakashio/Sazanami/Shiosai/Ayame 

Named passenger trains of Japan
East Japan Railway Company
Railway services introduced in 1972
1972 establishments in Japan